Circle of Dolls is the third album by American rock supergroup KXM. It was released via Rat Pak and Frontiers Records on September 13, 2019 and it was produced by KXM and Chris Collier.

It was preceded by the singles "War of Words" on July 23, "Lightning" on August 8 and "Time Flies" on September 12.

Track listing 
All songs written by Doug Pinnick, George Lynch and Ray Luzier.

Personnel 
Doug Pinnick – vocals, bass guitar, producing
George Lynch – guitars, producing
Ray Luzier – drums, producing

Additional personnel
Oscar Santiago – percussion
Chris Collier – backing vocals, producing, recording, mixing
Scott Bush – percussion recording
Maor Appelbaum – mastering
Jean Michel (DSNS Artwork) – artwork
Kevin Baldes – photography

References 

2019 albums
KXM albums